WAKU (94.1 FM) is a radio station broadcasting a Contemporary Christian format. Licensed to Crawfordville, Florida, USA, the station serves the Tallahassee area.  The station is currently owned by Altrua Investments International Corp. and features programming from Salem Communications.

References

External links

Radio stations established in 1975
1975 establishments in Florida
AKU